Hoodlum: Music Inspired By the Motion Picture is the soundtrack to Bill Duke's 1997 crime drama film Hoodlum. It was released on August 12, 1997 via Loud Records and Interscope Records, and consisted of a blend of hip hop and R&B music. The album features songs performed by 112, Adriana Evans, Big Boi, Big Bub, Big Noyd, Chico DeBarge, Cool Breeze, Davina, Erykah Badu, Faith Evans, L.V., Mobb Deep, Rahsaan Patterson, Rakim, Tony Rich and Wu-Tang Clan.

The soundtrack peaked at number 94 on the Billboard 200 and at number 23 on the Top R&B/Hip-Hop Albums chart in the United States. Mobb Deep's single "Hoodlum" reached number 29 on the Hot Rap Songs chart.

Track listing

Notes
Track 5 contains elements from "Minnie the Moocher" as performed by Cab Calloway.

Score
A second soundtrack, featuring Elmer Bernstein's score for the film, was issued by RCA Victor Red Seal/BMG Classics at the time of the film's release. The score was recorded in London by the Royal Philharmonic Orchestra, conducted by the composer. The album was produced by the composer's daughter, Emilie A. Bernstein (who also orchestrated the score).

Track listing

Charts

References

External links

1997 soundtrack albums
Drama film soundtracks
Hip hop soundtracks
Albums produced by RZA
Contemporary R&B soundtracks
Albums produced by Sean Combs
Interscope Records soundtracks
Loud Records soundtracks
Albums produced by Organized Noize